Venne is a surname. Notable people with the surname include:

Carl Venne (1946–2009), Native American leader
James Miles Venne (died 2007), Canadian aboriginal leader
Joseph Venne (1858–1925), Canadian architect
Lottie Venne (1852–1928), English actor, comedian and singer
Michel Venne (born 1960), Canadian journalist and writer
Pierrette Venne (born 1945), Canadian politician
Stéphane Venne (born 1941), Canadian singer-songwriter and composer

See also

Vennes
 
van de Venne (disambiguation)
Vanne (disambiguation)